The 1981 Romania rugby union tour of Scotland was a series of three matches played by the Romania national rugby union team in Scotland in September 1981. Romania won both of their three matches but lost the international match against the Scotland national rugby union team. Scotland awarded full international caps to its players for the match, becoming the first British country to do so for a match against Romania.

Matches
Scores and results list Romania's points tally first.

Touring party

Manager: Viorel Morariu
Assistant Managers: Valeriu Irimescu
Captain: Mircea Paraschiv

Backs

Forwards

References

Sources

1981 rugby union tours
1981
1981
1981–82 in Scottish rugby union
1981 in Romanian sport
1981–82 in European rugby union